Ouarkoye is a town approximately  west of Ouagadougou, Burkina Faso. It is the capital of Ouarkoye Department in Mouhoun Province. The town has a population of 3,916. Brig. General Yaoua Michel Tamini was from this village.

It is also rarely spelled Ouarkaye. Several other towns in Burkina Faso have similar names: Ouargaye, Ouarokuy and Ouarakuy.

References

Populated places in the Boucle du Mouhoun Region